Below is a list of notable people from Skopje, North Macedonia or its surroundings.

Artists

Bojana Barltrop, artist and photographer

Fashion designers
Nikola Eftimov

Painters
Sabri Berkel
Abdurrahim Buza
Maja Dzartovska
Petar Gligorovski
Mice Jankulovski
Petar Mazev

Business, industry, academics

Dragoslav Avramović, economist, governor of the National Bank of Yugoslavia
 Dimitrije Bužarovski, scientist
 Marko Čalasan, youngest information technology engineer in the world, has worked for Microsoft since age 9
Ljubomir Maksimović, historian
 Veni Markovski, Internet pioneer 
Zoran T. Popovski, scientist and professor
Şarık Tara, founder of ENKA
Mike S. Zafirovski, businessman involved in the success of several American companies

Musicians, bands, composers

Lorenc Antoni, composer
Arhangel, band
Darko Dimitrov, songwriter, composer, and music producer
 Adrian Gaxha, singer
 Vaska Ilieva, folk singer
 Andrijana Janevska, singer
 Vlado Janevski, singer
 Jovan Jovanov, singer and composer
 Andrea Koevska, singer who will represent North Macedonia in the Eurovision Song Contest 2022
Aleksandar Makedonski
Lindon Berisha, singer and songwriter 
Mizar, band
 Blagoj Nacoski, tenor opera singer
 Goce Nikolovski, singer
 Barbara Popović, singer
 Kanita , singer 
 Esma Redžepova, vocalist
 Elena Risteska, singer and songwriter
 Altuna Sejdiu, singer
 Muharem Serbezovski, singer
 Branimir Štulić, singer and composer
 Tamara Todevska, singer who represented North Macedonia in the Eurovision Song Contest 2019
 Tijana Todevska-Dapčević, singer
 Simon Trpceski, classical pianist
 Martin Vučić, singer
 Toni Zen, rapper

Movie, television figures, models and journalists

 Filiz Ahmet, actress
 Milka Babović, figure skating TV presenter
 Petar Gligorovski, animated movie director
 Katarina Ivanovska, model
 Ivo Jankoski, producer, fine arts manager, publisher and promoter
 Milčo Mančevski, film director 
 Labina Mitevska, actress
 Naum Panovski, theatre director and writer
 Dragan Pavloviḱ Latas, journalist
 Stole Popov, film director
 Ljubiša Samardžić, actor
 Alaettin Tahir, journalist
 Avni Qahili, journalist

Politicians and historical figures

Strašo Angelovski
Vlado Bučkovski, former Prime Minister of the Republic of Macedonia
Constantine Tikh of Bulgaria, Tsar of Bulgaria
Stevo Crvenkovski, former foreign minister of Macedonia
Boris Drangov, Bulgarian colonel
Lazar Elenovski, Macedonian Minister of Defence
Ljubomir Frčkoski, former presidential candidate
Atanasije II Gavrilović, Patriarch of the Serbian Orthodox Church
Nevena Georgieva, youngest fighter and first woman among the Macedonian Yugoslav partisan units
Nikola Gruevski, former Prime Minister of Macedonia
Ratko Janev, atomic physicist
Zoran Jolevski, Macedonian ambassador to the United States
Justin I, Eastern Roman Emperor
Justinian I, Eastern Roman Emperor
Kalinik I, Patriarch of the Serbian Orthodox Church
Srgjan Kerim, former president of the United Nations General Assembly
Emil Kirjas, politician
Blerim Reka, politician
Zana Ramadani, German politician
Trifun Kostovski, former mayor of Skopje
Maksim I, Serbian Patriarch
Venko Markovski, writer, poet and political figure
Ljubomir Mihajlovski, former Minister of Internal Affairs
Ilinka Mitreva, former foreign minister
Jordan Nikolov Orce, communist and partisan
Bujar Osmani, current Minister of Foreign Affairs 
Radmila Šekerinska, current Minister of Defense
Ali Shefqet Shkupi, Lieutenant Colonel
Theodahad, King of the Ostrogoths
Vasil Tupurkovski

Sports figures
 Vlatko Andonovski, head coach of the United States women's national soccer team
 Lirim Zendeli, German racer
 Pero Antić, basketball player
 Boban Babunski, football coach
 Agim Sopi, football coach
 Aleksandar Bajevski, footballer
 Muharem Bajrami, footballer
 Enis Bardhi, footballer 
 Mirjana Boševska, freestyle and medley swimmer
 Aleksandar Colovic, chess player
 Besir Demiri, footballer 
 Ertan Demiri, footballer
 Filip Despotovski, footballer
 Fisnik Zuka – footballer
 Kiril Dojčinovski, former Yugoslav footballer
 Mario Đurovski, football striker for FK Vojvodina
 Antonio Filevski, retired footballer
 Jane Gavalovski, footballer
 Enver Idrizi, karateka
 Saša Ilić, goalkeeper
 Filip Ivanovski, footballer
 Čedomir Janevski, head coach of the Macedonia national football team
 Zoran Jovanovski, footballer
 Suat Zendeli – footballer
 Stefan Kozlov, tennis player
 Luka Nakov, footballer
 Zlatko Nastevski, retired footballer
 Nderim Nexhipi, footballer
 Ardian Nuhiu, footballer
 Žarko Odžakov, retired footballer
 Darko Pančev, European Cup-winning footballer
 Drita Islami – Macedonian hurdler
 Afrodita Salihi – footballer
 Aleksandar Popovski, footballer
 Lazar Popovski, kayaker
 Zekirija Ramadani, footballer
 Ivana Rožman, track and field athlete
 Berat Sadik, Finnish striker
 Predrag Samardžiski, basketball player
 Dušan Savić, footballer
 Shaban Sejdiu, wrestler
 Kiril Simonovski, footballer
 Jasir Asani – footballer
 Metodije Spasovski, former footballer
 Goran Stankovski, footballer
 Mevlan Adili – footballer
 Muhamed Demiri, footballer
 Darko Tasevski, footballer
 Goce Toleski, footballer
 Sedat Berisha – footballer
 Shaban Tërstena, wrestler
 Aleksandar Vasoski, defender for Eintracht Frankfurt
 Blagoja Vidinić, former football coach and former football player
 Muzafer Ejupi, footballer
 Zoran Zlatkovski, footballer

Writers, novelists, and poets
 Yahya Kemal Beyatlı, poet 
 Rumena Bužarovska, writer 
 Slavko Janevski, poet, prose writer
 Venko Markovski, writer, poet and political figure
 Olivera Nikolova, novelist
 Naum Panovski, writer
 Aleksandar Prokopiev, novelist and essayist 
 Goce Smilevski, writer
 Jovica Tasevski-Eternijan, poet, essayist, and literary critic
 Gane Todorovoski, poet, author, translator, essayist

Others

 Ana Colovic Lesoska, environmental activist
 Mother Teresa, Roman Catholic nun (now Saint Teresa of Calcutta)
 Nathan of Gaza, Jewish mystic

References

 
Skopje